In phonology, voicing (or sonorization) is a sound change where a voiceless consonant becomes voiced due to the influence of its phonological environment; shift in the opposite direction is referred to as devoicing or desonorization. Most commonly, the change is a result of sound assimilation with an adjacent sound of opposite voicing, but it can also occur word-finally or in contact with a specific vowel.

For example, the English suffix -s is pronounced  when it follows a voiceless phoneme (cats), and  when it follows a voiced phoneme (dogs).

English
English no longer has a productive process of voicing stem-final fricatives when forming noun-verb pairs or plural nouns, but there are still examples of voicing from earlier in the history of English:

 belief – believe
 shelf – shelve
 grief – grieve
 life – live
 proof – prove
 strife – strive
 thief – thieve
 bath - bathe
 breath - breathe
 mouth – mouth
 sheath - sheathe
 wreath - wreathe
 advice – advise
 house – house
 use – use

Synchronically, the assimilation at morpheme boundaries is still productive, such as in:

 cat + s → cats
 dog + s → dogs
 miss + ed → missed
 whizz + ed → whizzed

The voicing alternation found in plural formation is losing ground in the modern language,. Of the alternations listed below many speakers retain only the  pattern, which is supported by the orthography. As the language became more analytic and less inflectional, final vowels or syllables stopped being pronounced. For example, modern knives is a one syllable word instead of a two syllable word, with the vowel e not pronounced and no longer part of the word's structure. The alternation pattern is well maintained for the items listed immediately below, but its loss as a productive allophonic rule permits its abandonment for new usages of even well-established terms: while leaf~leaves in reference to 'outgrowth of plant stem' remains vigorous, the Toronto ice hockey team is uncontroversially named the Maple Leafs.

 knife – knives
 leaf – leaves
 wife – wives
 wolf – wolves

The following mutations are optional:

 bath - baths
 mouth - mouths
 oath - oaths
 path - paths
 youth - youths
 house – houses

Sonorants following aspirated fortis plosives (that is,  in the onsets of stressed syllables unless preceded by ) are devoiced such as in please, crack, twin, and pewter.

Several varieties of English have a productive synchronic rule of /t/-voicing whereby intervocalic /t/ not followed by a stressed vowel is realized as voiced alveolar flap [ɾ], as in tutor, with the first /t/ pronounced as voiceless aspirated [tʰ] and the second as voiced [ɾ]. Voiced phoneme /d/ can also emerge as [ɾ], so that tutor and Tudor may be homophones, both with [ɾ] (the voiceless identity of word-internal /t/ in tutor is manifested in tutorial, where stress shift assures [tʰ]).

In other languages

Voicing assimilation 

In many languages, including Polish and Russian, there is anticipatory assimilation of unvoiced obstruents immediately before voiced obstruents. For example, Russian  'request' is pronounced  (instead of ) and Polish  'request' is pronounced  (instead of ). The process can cross word boundaries as well: Russian   'daughter would'. The opposite type of anticipatory assimilation happens to voiced obstruents before unvoiced ones:  .

In Italian, /s/ before a voiced consonant is pronounced [z] within any phonological word: sbaglio [ˈzbaʎʎo] 'mistake', slitta [ˈzlitta] 'sled', snello [ˈznɛllo] 'slender'. The rule applies across morpheme boundaries (disdire [dizˈdiːre] 'cancel') but not word boundaries (lapis nero [ˌlaːpisˈneːro] 'black pencil'). This voicing is productive and so it applies also to borrowings, not only to native lexicon: snob [znɔb], slinky (toy) [ˈzliŋki].

Final devoicing 

Final devoicing is a systematic phonological process occurring in languages such as German, Dutch, Polish, Russian and Catalan. Such languages have voiced obstruents in the syllable coda or at the end of a word become voiceless.

Initial voicing 
Initial voicing is a process of historical sound change in which voiceless consonants become voiced at the beginning of a word. Some English dialects were affected as well, but it is rare in Modern English. One example is fox (with the original consonant) compared to vixen (with a voiced consonant).

Notes

References 
 
 

Phonology
Phonotactics
Assimilation (linguistics)